Werner Josef Krieglstein (born October 31, 1941) is an American scholar, director and actor. Krieglstein is the founder of a neo-Nietzschean philosophical school called Transcendental Perspectivism. Krieglstein's "philosophy of compassion" has been the subject of symposium lectures at many prominent conferences including the UNESCO section of the World Congress of Philosophy conference in Seoul Korea (August, 2008),  the ISAIL "Fields of Conflict-Fields of Wisdom": 4th International Congress in Wuerzburg, Germany (May, 2008), the meeting of the American Philosophical Association in Washington D.C. (Symposium Chair: Sept. 2006), and the ISUD Fourth World Conference of the International Society for Universal Dialogue (Summer, 2001), among many others.

Career

Academic background
Krieglstein was born in 1941 in Blatnice, (near Plzeň), at the time an annexed part of Nazi Germany's Sudetenland (present-day Blatnice, Czech Republic). Following the post-war Expulsion of the Germans from Czechoslovakia, he relocated in Beselich-Obertiefenbach near Frankfurt, Germany. In the Sixties, Krieglstein was a student at the Frankfurt School in Germany, under the professorship of Theodor W. Adorno. In his first book, Krieglstein credits the roots of his passion for the transformative aspects of philosophy to the tutelage of Adorno. As a German Jew, Adorno returned to Germany almost immediately after WWII ended with the goal of challenging the indoctrination many university students had received in Hitler's youth education programs. Before moving to the United States, Krieglstein also studied at the Free University of Berlin. Following his studies in Germany, Krieglstein pursued his doctorate at the University of Chicago as a Fulbright Scholar and University Fellow.

Krieglstein has held teaching positions at the University of Helsinki, Finland, and Western Michigan University in Kalamazoo. He currently is professor emeritus of philosophy and religious studies at the College of DuPage, where he was awarded the Most Outstanding Teacher Award in 2003 and the Distinguished Regional Humanities Educator Award from the Community College Humanities Association in 2008. In addition to his role as professor, Krieglstein is a course director at the Interuniversity Center in Dubrovnik, Croatia,  and a board member of the International Society for Universal Dialogue. His philosophy of compassion is also finding an audience within the education reform movement, with symposium lectures at AEPL "Reclaiming the Wisdom Tradition for Education" conference in Northern California (May, 2008), the NISOD International Conference on Teaching and Leadership Excellence in Austin, TX (May, 2007),  and the CCHA Creating Communities Conference hosted by the University of Chicago (Nov, 2006).

Actor and director
While at the Johann Wolfgang Goethe University Frankfurt am Main, Krieglstein rose to prominence in theater when he was appointed as director of the avant-garde theater, Die Neue Bühne, at the Goethe University. While writing for the theater's paper, he interviewed members of The Living Theater including Jerzy Grotowski, and was fortunate enough to study mime under Marceau student Jeanne Winkler. An ISAIL biography notes that "his black light production of Kafka's The Metamorphosis was performed over two hundred times at both European and American festivals." After emigrating to the US and while teaching at Western Michigan University in 1976, he founded and directed a small rural theater company in Lawrence, Michigan known as the Whole Arts Theater, which later moved to Kalamazoo. Michigan's official tourism site describing Krieglstein's founding of the Whole Art Theater. More recently, Krieglstein has shifted his acting focus to film. In the past few years, he has worked on several independent films including 'Urban Ground Squirrels' by Wiggle Puppy Productions, Chicago (Mark Krieglstein, 2002) and the internationally known 'Light Denied'  by Delos Films, Warsaw (Paweł Kuczyński, 2008),  along with a few smaller films.

Personal life

Krieglstein is married to Maryann Krieglstein. After attaining his PhD, the two lived in a few places around the world including Finland and Morocco before settling down on an organic farm in Lawrence, Michigan. While farming, he continued to teach and pursue acting in nearby Kalamazoo. In 1990, Krieglstein moved with his family to Glen Ellyn, Illinois, home to the College of DuPage where he would begin his almost 20 year professorship. Together, Maryann and Werner have five sons and one grandson: Robin (07/01/71), married to Suruchi have a son named Milan (03/14/09); Mark (02/25/75); Daniel (03/31/79), married to Andrea Trocchio; Thomas (12/05/80); and Michael (09/02/84).

Philosophy 

Transcendental perspectivism is a hybrid philosophy blending Friedrich Nietzsche's perspectivism and the utopian ideals of the transcendentalist movement. Transcendental perspectivism challenges Nietzsche's claim that there is no absolute truths while fully accepting his observation that all truth can only be known in the context of one's perception. This is accomplished through an appreciation of the emotional relationship between two perceptions (the "perceiver" and the "other"). In the simplest of terms, a transcendental truth can only be known when two individuals come to agree on the truth by either force or cooperation, thus working together to build a shared reality.

Awards and academic achievements 

Awards

Achievements

Publications

See also
American philosophy
List of American philosophers

References

External links
 Transcendental Perspectivism: The Third Enlightenment 'Home Page'
 Transcendental Perspectivism on MySpace
 
 
 
 Krieglstein in Chinese (conference paper)

1941 births
Living people
20th-century American philosophers
21st-century American philosophers
German philosophers
Frankfurt School
Feminist studies scholars
Philosophers of mind
American consciousness researchers and theorists
Western Michigan University faculty
Goethe University Frankfurt alumni
University of Chicago alumni
University of Chicago fellows
German Bohemian people
German people of German Bohemian descent
German emigrants to the United States
People from Glen Ellyn, Illinois
Male feminists
Postmodern feminists
Critical theorists
Poststructuralists
German male writers